Asher Keddie (born 31 July 1974) is an Australian actress. Beginning her career in the television series Five Mile Creek in the mid 1980s, Keddie received wide recognition for her role in the television series Offspring. Her significant repertoire in television has led to her being dubbed as the 'Golden Girl of Australian Television'. Keddie also had a small role in the film X-Men Origins: Wolverine, as Dr. Carol Frost. Aside from television and film work, she has several theatre credits, including in the Melbourne Theatre Company production of Les Liaisons dangereuses as Madame de Tourvel.

She won the Logie Award for Most Popular Actress five times in a row between 2011 and 2015. Keddie won the 2013 Gold Logie award for Most Popular Personality on Australian Television, for her role as Dr Nina Proudman in the Network Ten drama Offspring. She had previously been nominated twice for the award. Keddie has a total of seven Logie Awards.

Early life
Keddie was born to Robi and James Keddie, both school teachers. As a child, she took dancing lessons for nine years and at age 14, she dislocated her knee prior to an audition at the Australian Ballet School. Despite her initial misfortune, she landed an acting gig in a dance wear ad while at ballet school and subsequently landed an agent. Keddie completed her secondary education at St Michael's Grammar School, St Kilda.

Entertainment career

Television and film career
Keddie had guest roles early in her career in various television dramas, including her first roles in Five Mile Creek (1985), Fortress (1986) and Janus (1994). She played the role of Marriane Sheridan in Blue Heelers (season 3, episode 21) airing on 18 June 1996 and Good Guys, Bad Guys (1997). From 1997 to 1998, she came to the attention of senior network television producers, appearing in State Coroner. Following this, she had a recurring role in Stingers from 2000 to 2004.

Keddie's big break came in 2004, where she had a leading role in Love My Way, a drama series airing on Foxtel. The series ended in late 2007. This role led to Keddie being nominated for various awards for playing the part of Julia Jackson, a woman who struggles to cope with her own identity in the midst of family tragedy. Keddie's award win came at the end of Love My Way third series in 2006.

In 2009, Keddie appeared in three different roles. She portrayed police officer Liz Cruickshank in the television drama Underbelly: A Tale of Two Cities and journalist Jacinta Burns, in the TV series Rush, as well as Dr Carol Frost in X-Men Origins: Wolverine.

In 2010, Keddie depicted author Blanche d'Alpuget in Hawke, a telemovie about the premiership of Bob Hawke (the Prime Minister of Australia, 1983–91). She also became the star of the drama series Offspring, which began airing in August 2010. In April 2011, she had the leading role of Ita Buttrose in ABC1's telemovie Paper Giants: The Birth of Cleo, the story of Buttrose's rise to success as the editor of Cleo magazine.

In 2014, Keddie starred in Party Tricks as Premier Kate Ballard. Ballard faces an election campaign alongside newly announced Opposition candidate David McLeod (Rodger Corser), with whom she once had a tumultuous affair.

In 2019, Keddie starred in the ABC1 acclaimed series "The Cry". In March 2020, she starred in a 6 part series on ABC1, "Stateless". The series also stars and is produced by Australian actress, Cate Blanchett and is set in a detention centre in the middle of the Australian outback. 

In 2021, Keddie played Heather Marconi in the Nicole Kidman led Hulu series, Nine Perfect Strangers alongside Melissa McCarthy, Samara Weaving and Bobby Cannavale.

Stage
Making her theatre debut for the Melbourne Theatre Company in 1998 in Patrick Marber's Closer, Keddie went on to appear in Cyrano de Bergerac, Les Liaisons dangereuses, Birthrights, Great Expectations, The Seagull and Hannie Rayson's Life After George. Her performances in the 2005 Melbourne Theatre Company production of Les Liaisons dangereuses, and the Playbox's The Ishmael Club, both earned her Green Room Award nominations.

In 2007 Keddie starred alongside Jay Bowen in the Melbourne Theatre Company's play The Glass Soldier written by Hannie Rayson.

Personal life
Keddie married actor and musician Jay Bowen in January 2007. The pair separated in December 2011. In April 2014, she married artist Vincent Fantauzzo. On 19 November 2014 she announced at the GQ Men's Award that she was pregnant. On 1 March 2015, the couple welcomed their first child, a boy named Valentino Fantauzzo.

Filmography

Awards and nominations

References

External links

 

1974 births
Australian film actresses
Australian television actresses
Living people
People educated at St Michael's Grammar School
Australian stage actresses
Actresses from Melbourne
Gold Logie winners
20th-century Australian actresses
21st-century Australian actresses